The  are a mountain range spanning Gifu, Toyama, Ishikawa, Fukui and Shiga prefectures in Japan. It is divided into the Kaetsu Mountains (加越山地 Kaetsu Sanchi), whose major peak is Mount Haku, and the Etsumi Mountains (越美山地 Etsumi Sanchi), whose major peak is Mount Nōgōhaku. The range derives its name from the two major peaks, which both have "haku" in their names. Most of the Ryōhaku Mountains are within Hakusan National Park.

Major peaks

Kaetsu Mountains 
 Mount Ōgasa (大笠山), 
 Mount Oizuru (笈ヶ岳), 
 Mount Sanpōiwa (三方岩岳), 
 Mount Nodanishōji (野谷荘司山), 
 Mount Haku (白山), 
 Mount Bessan (別山), 
 Mount Sannomine (三ノ峰), 
 Mount Dainichi (大日ヶ岳),

Etsumi Mountains 
 Mount Heike (平家岳), 
 Mount Nōgōhaku (能郷白山), 
 Mount Byōbu (屏風山), 
 Mount Kanmuri (冠山), 
 Mount Sanshū (三周ヶ岳), 
 Mount Mikuni (三国山),

See also 

 Geography of Japan
 Hakusan National Park

References

External links 
 ( Mt.Haku )
 ( Mt.Nōgōhaku )

Mountain ranges of Gifu Prefecture
Mountain ranges of Toyama Prefecture
Mountain ranges of Ishikawa Prefecture
Mountain ranges of Fukui Prefecture
Mountain ranges of Shiga Prefecture